Georgetown is a census-designated place in Fairfield County, Connecticut, United States. It is located in the area where the towns of Wilton, Redding, Weston, and Ridgefield meet.

Georgetown and its surrounding area are also defined as the Georgetown census-designated place (CDP). As of the 2010 census, the population of the CDP was 1,805.

Georgetown is located at the southwest corner of the town of Redding, the northwest corner of the town of Weston, the northeast corner of the town of Wilton, and the southeast corner of Ridgefield. Georgetown residents officially live in and pay local taxes to one of these four towns, but typically identify themselves as living in Georgetown. Georgetown has its own fire district, which also serves the surrounding rural areas not traditionally included in Georgetown, and its own ZIP code (06829).

Historic district

On April 9, 1987, the central portion of Georgetown was listed on the U.S. National Register of Historic Places as the Georgetown Historic District.  A map shows its approximate location within Georgetown.  The historic district is an area of  that includes the Gilbert and Bennett manufacturing plant, institutional housing built for the plant workers, and other private homes. The district includes portions of Georgetown in the towns of Redding and Wilton.

Geography

Demographics

As of the census of 2000, there were 1,650 people, 572 households, and 455 families residing in the CDP. The racial makeup of the CDP was 90.62% White, 1.33% African American, 0.24% Native American, 3.39% Asian, 0.48% from other races, and 0.55% from two or more races. Hispanic or Latino of any race were 3.39% of the population.

There were 572 households, out of which 44.9% had children under the age of 18 living with them, 71.0% were married couples living together, 4.7% had a female householder with no husband present, and 20.3% were non-families. 16.3% of all households were made up of individuals, and 5.9% had someone living alone who was 65 years of age or older.  The average household size was 2.87 and the average family size was 3.27.

In the CDP, the population was spread out, with 30.4% under the age of 18, 3.3% from 18 to 24, 29.9% from 25 to 44, 27.7% from 45 to 64, and 8.7% who were 65 years of age or older.  The median age was 38 years. For every 100 females, there were 100.0 males.  For every 100 females age 18 and over, there were 99.1 males.

The median income for a household in the CDP was $103,424, and the median income for a family was $110,081. Males had a median income of $81,538 versus $59,531 for females. The per capita income for the CDP was $55,029.  About 2.0% of families and 4.7% of the population were below the poverty line, including 3.5% of those under age 18 and 4.6% of those age 65 or over.

Movies filmed in Georgetown
Reckless (1995)
Other People's Money (1991)
Rachel, Rachel (1968)

Pictures

See also

Branchville (Ridgefield), a section of the town of Ridgefield sometimes considered part of Georgetown.

References

External links

 History of Georgetown, Connecticut, from the History of Redding website
 Lisa Prevost, "A Mill Town Writes Its Next Chapter", part of the "Living In" section in the Real Estate section of The New York Times, January 30, 2005 and August 29, 2006
 Photographs of Historic Buildings, Town of Wilton website

 
Redding, Connecticut
Ridgefield, Connecticut
Weston, Connecticut
Wilton, Connecticut
Census-designated places in Fairfield County, Connecticut
Villages in Connecticut
Villages in Fairfield County, Connecticut
Census-designated places in Connecticut